Bangubangu is a Bantu dialect cluster spoken by the Bangubangu people of the Democratic Republic of the Congo.

The dialects are about 80% similar, apart from Hombo which is only 70% similar to the main dialect. It is possible that they are distinct languages. Christine Ahmed (1995) classifies the small "Bangubangu of Mutingua" apart from the rest, with the Luba rather than Hemba languages; this is presumably a Hombo dialect.

One of the earliest scholars to study Bangubangu was A. E. Meeussen, who wrote a brief description of the grammar of the language as a result of a visit to the area in 1951.

References

Luban languages
Languages of the Democratic Republic of the Congo